Tekonsha is a village in Tekonsha Township, Calhoun County in the U.S. state of Michigan. It is part of the Battle Creek, Michigan Metropolitan Statistical Area. The population was 717 at the 2010 census.

Tekonsha is the birthplace of Talbert Abrams, famous as the "Father of Aerial Photography."

Geography

Demographics

2010 census
As of the census of 2010, there were 717 people, 282 households, and 194 families living in the village. The racial makeup of the village was 96.0% White, 0.4% Native American, 0.7% Asian, 0.1% from other races, and 2.8% from two or more races. Hispanic or Latino of any race were 0.8% of the population.

There were 282 households, of which 32.6% had children under the age of 18 living with them, 46.5% were married couples living together, 15.2% had a female householder with no husband present, 7.1% had a male householder with no wife present, and 31.2% were non-families. 23.4% of all households were made up of individuals, and 11.7% had someone living alone who was 65 years of age or older. The average household size was 2.54 and the average family size was 2.97.

The median age in the village was 40 years. 24.4% of residents were under the age of 18; 7.3% were between the ages of 18 and 24; 24.9% were from 25 to 44; 26.9% were from 45 to 64; and 16.5% were 65 years of age or older. The gender makeup of the village was 47.0% male and 53.0% female.

2000 census
As of the census of 2000, there were 712 people, 290 households, and 198 families living in the village. The racial makeup of the village was 96.49% White, 0.14% African American, 0.56% Native American, and 2.81% from two or more races. Hispanic or Latino of any race were 0.84% of the population.

There were 290 households, out of which 30.7% had children under the age of 18 living with them, 53.4% were married couples living together, 9.3% had a female householder with no husband present, and 31.7% were non-families. 26.6% of all households were made up of individuals, and 10.3% had someone living alone who was 65 years of age or older. The average household size was 2.46 and the average family size was 2.93.

In the village, the population was spread out, with 24.7% under the age of 18, 8.3% from 18 to 24, 30.3% from 25 to 44, 22.9% from 45 to 64, and 13.8% who were 65 years of age or older. The median age was 37 years. For every 100 females, there were 93.0 males. For every 100 females age 18 and over, there were 94.9 males.

The median income for a household in the village was $39,917, and the median income for a family was $48,375. Males had a median income of $34,375 versus $25,750 for females. The per capita income for the village was $18,531. About 4.8% of families and 7.1% of the population were below the poverty line, including 5.4% of those under age 18 and 5.4% of those age 65 or over.

References

External links
 
 

Villages in Calhoun County, Michigan
Villages in Michigan